Charles A. Mason was a Michigan politician.

Early life
Charles A. Mason purchased Austin B. Witherbee's self-named drug store downtown and ran it for 22 years.  It is now the name of a new grocery store set to open in spring 2009 to serve the downtown area at the corner of King Avenue and University Drive, the former old Hats by Jake building.

Political life
He was elected as the mayor of the City of Flint in 1881 serving a 1-year term.

Post-Political life

References

Mayors of Flint, Michigan
19th-century American politicians